Return To Eden is a 1988 science fiction novel by American writer Harry Harrison.

The novel is the third and final volume in Harrison's Eden. The first two stories of the trilogy are West of Eden and Winter in Eden.

The novel tells an alternate history of planet Earth in which the extinction of the dinosaurs never occurred. There is a war between a group of Cro-Magnon-level humans, who are descended from New World monkeys, and a reptilian race called Yilanè, who are descended from the prehistoric mosasaur and have become the dominant lifeform on the planet.

The central characters from the first book return, Vaintè, an ambitious Yilanè, and Kerrick, a "ustuzou" (the Yilanè word for mammal) captured by the Yilanè as a boy and raised by them. Kerrick eventually escapes to rejoin his own people and burn the Yilanè colony city.

Plot
Kerrick's tribe, which now includes the two male Yilanè who have elected to remain with him, live an almost idyllic life at a small lake, until a raiding party from Alpèsak captures and rapes one of the males, who later dies. The tribe moves east and find a peaceful island. Later Herilak's tribe joins them.

The scientist Ambalasi studies the primitive Yilanè, in between solving the problems involved in getting the Daughters of Life to work, since they are all regarded as equal, so none may lead the work force.

Vaintè makes her way along the coast to a Yilanè city. She persuades the leader there to let her lead a group in search of the Daughters of Life, secretly planning to seek out and kill Kerrick and the other humans.

The weapons the humans stole from the Yilanè begin to die. Without them, they won't be able to kill the larger dinosaurs which threaten their safety this far south. However, the expedition goes wrong and Lanefenuu, who is the leader of Alpèsak now learns their presence. Ambalasi contacts Lanefenuu to divert the attention while the Daughters of Life try to recruit new members and some males. This mission also fails.

The expedition of Vaintè contacts Lanefenuu and learns the whereabouts of the Daughters of Life. They capture Ambalasi as ordered, but then Vaintè turns on her leader and takes Enge hostage. She finds Kerrick, but before killing him, the surviving Yilanè male kills her.

External links
 Return to Eden page on Official website

1988 American novels
1988 science fiction novels
American science fiction novels
American alternate history novels
Irish science fiction novels
Irish alternative history novels
Novels by Harry Harrison
Novels about dinosaurs
Novels set in prehistory